This list of the amphibians of Pakistan currently contains 19 confirmed species that are known to occur in Pakistan.

Order Anura

Family Bufonidae (true toads) - 8 species
Bufo himalayanus (Himalayan Toad)
Bufo latastii (Baltistan Toad)
Bufo melanostictus (Common Indian Toad)
Bufo olivaceus (Olive Toad)
Bufo pseudoraddei Photographs of subspecies
Bufo p. pseudoraddei (Kaghan Toad)
Bufo p. baturae (Batura Toad)
Bufo stomaticus (Indus Valley Toad or Marbled Toad) "National amphibian of Pakistan"
Bufo surdus (Iranian Toad or Pakistan Toad)
Bufo viridis zugmayeri (European Green Toad or Baluchistan Toad)
Family Microhylidae (narrow-mouthed frogs) - 2 species
Microhyla ornata (Ornate Narrow-mouthed Frog or Ant Frog)
Uperodon systoma (Marbled Balloon Frog)
Family Megophryidae (Asian toads and litter frogs) - 1 confirmed species
Scutiger nyingchiensis (Tibetan Frog or Asian Lazy Toad)
Scutiger occidentalis (Deosai Toad) - unconfirmed
Scutiger pleskei - unconfirmed

Family Ranidae (broad-mouthed frogs or true frogs) - 8 species
Euphlyctis cyanophlyctis (Indian Skipper Frog or Skittering Frog) - 3 subspecies
Euphlyctis c. cyanophlyctis (Common Skittering Frog)
Euphlyctis c. microspinulata (Spiny Skittering Frog)
Euphlyctis c. seistanica (Seistan Skittering Frog)
Fejervarya limnocharis (Alpine Cricket Frog or Northern Cricket Frog)
Fejervarya syhadrensis (Indus Cricket Frog or Southern Cricket Frog)
Hoplobatrachus tigerinus (Indus Valley Bullfrog)
Paa hazarensis (Hazara Torrent Frog)
Paa sternosignata (Karez Frog)
Paa vicina (Murree Hills Frog)
Sphaerotheca breviceps (Indian Burrowing Frog or Malir Burrowing Frog)

References
 http://www.wildlifeofpakistan.com/AmphibiansofPakistan/broadmouthfrogsofPakistan.htm
 STÖCK M., M. SCHMID, C. STEINLEIN AND W.-R. GROSSE (1999): Mosaicism in somatic triploid specimens of the Bufo viridis complex in the Karakoram with examination of calls, morphology and taxonomic conclusions. Ital. J. Zool. (Modena) 66 (3): 215-232.
 STÖCK M., D. FRYNTA, W.-R. GROSSE, C. STEINLEIN, M. SCHMID (2001). A review of the distribution of diploid, triploid and tetraploid green toads (Bufo viridis complex) in Asia including new data from Iran and Pakistan. Asiatic Herp. Res. (Berkeley) 9: 77-100.
 STÖCK M., R. GÜNTHER AND W. BÖHME (2001). Progress towards a taxonomic revision of the Asian Bufo viridis group: Current status of nominal taxa and unsolved problems (Amphibia: Anura: Bufonidae). Zool. Abh. Staatl. Mus. Tierkunde Dresden 51: 253–319.
 STÖCK M., D. K. LAMATSCH, C. STEINLEIN, J. T. EPPLEN, W.-R. GROSSE, R. HOCK, T. KLAPPERSTÜCK, K. P. LAMPERT, U. SCHEER, M. SCHMID AND M. SCHARTL (2002): A bisexually reproducing all-triploid vertebrate. Nature Genetics 30 (3): 325-328.
 STÖCK M., MORITZ C., HICKERSON M., FRYNTA D., DUJSEBAYEVA T., EREMCHENKO V., MACEY J.R., PAPENFUSS T. J., AND WAKE D. B. (2006): Evolution of mitochondrial relationships and biogeography of Palearctic green toads (Bufo viridis subgroup) with insights in their genomic plasticity. Molecular Phylogenetics and Evolution 41:663-689.

External links
Wildlife of Pakistan - Amphibians

 
Amphibians
Pakistan
Pakistan